Guillermo J. Tearney is a professor of pathology at Harvard Medical School, a physicist in the department of dermatology at the Massachusetts General Hospital, a pathologist in the department of pathology at the Massachusetts General Hospital and runs a research laboratory at the Wellman Center for Photomedicine at the Massachusetts General Hospital in Boston Massachusetts. Tearney received his BA in applied mathematics, graduating cum laude (1988), his MD graduating magna cum laude (1998) from Harvard Medical School, and received his PhD in electrical engineering (1997) from the Massachusetts Institute of Technology. He is a well-known name in the field of biomedical optics, gastroenterology, and interventional cardiology for his prominent role on the development of endoscopic optical coherence tomography, in particular intracoronary optical coherence tomography, its translation to the clinic, and commercialization. He is recognized as one of the inventors of Intracoronary optical coherence tomography. He is also recognized as co-inventor of optical coherence tomography for endoscopic imaging and diagnosis of esophagus disorders, a clinical technology currently commercialized by NinePoint Medical.

His research focuses on translational medicine, developing and moving to clinical use optical imaging methods for disease diagnosis. Prof. Tearney has over 100 granted patents and licenses resulting in commercial medical devices. He has served as principal investigator on over 40 grants and published more than 150 papers in peer-reviewed interventional journals.

References

External links 
 Tearney Lab
 Harvard Catalyst Profile

Living people
Harvard Medical School alumni
MIT School of Engineering alumni
Harvard Medical School faculty
1966 births